Alexander John Wylie Furber (born February 20, 1987) is a Canadian actor, known for starring in the role of Albert in the Toronto production of War Horse.

Early life
Alex Furber grew up in Scarborough, east of downtown Toronto. He is the eldest child of Sandra and John Furber. His  sister Janelle is a graduate of U of T, while his younger sister Shelby is a fashion model. He attended Royal St. George's middle school, Trinity College School,  and the National Theatre School of Canada.

Stage acting career

References

External links
International Hit War Horse Opens in Toronto Feb. 28
 War Horse is Alex Furber's first major role
YouTube: Anne & Gilbert serve tea to Ottawa Commuters

Canadian male stage actors
National Theatre School of Canada alumni
Male actors from Toronto
1987 births
Living people